Itápolis is a municipality in the state of São Paulo in Brazil. The population is 43,331 (2020 est.) in an area of 997 km².

Sports
Oeste is the city's football (soccer) team. The club plays their home matches at Estádio dos Amaros, which has a maximum capacity of 16,143 people.

Twin towns
 Pomezia, Italy

References

Municipalities in São Paulo (state)
Populated places established in 1862
1862 establishments in Brazil